One Tree Island may refer to:

Pulau Satumu in Singapore
Magazine Island in Hong Kong
One Tree Island (Queensland), in Australia